Lewes Downs is a  biological Site of Special Scientific Interest east of Lewes in East Sussex. It is a Nature Conservation Review site, Grade I and a Special Area of Conservation. Part of it is a national nature reserve, part is Malling Down nature reserve, which is managed by the Sussex Wildlife Trust, and part is Mount Caburn, an Iron Age hill fort which is a Scheduled Monument.

This south-facing slope on the South Downs is ecologically rich chalk grassland and scrub. Flora include the nationally rare early-spider orchid and it also has a diverse invertebrate fauna and an important breeding community of downland birds.

References

Sites of Special Scientific Interest in East Sussex
National nature reserves in England
Nature Conservation Review sites
Special Areas of Conservation in England
Glynde